Zoo Keeper is an arcade video game created by Taito America and released in 1983. The player controls Zeke, a zookeeper, attempting to rescue his girlfriend Zelda from a zoo where the animals have escaped from their cages. The majority of the game takes place on a screen where the player builds a wall to keep animals in the zoo—jumping escaped animals to avoid contact. Two different platform game levels are interspersed every few rounds. Zoo Keeper was sold as a conversion kit for Taito's Qix.

Gameplay

Zoo Keeper has three different types of stages. In the zoo stage, Zeke runs around the edges of the screen to build up an outer wall and keep the animals from escaping. Each of these stages is timed, with collectible bonus items appearing at preset points. One item is always a net which can be used for a few seconds to put animals back in the cage at the center of the screen. Multiple nets appear in later zoo stages. When time runs out, points are awarded for every animal inside the wall perimeter.

Points are also earned for jumping over animals. Values grow exponentially for jumping multiple animals. It is possible get 1,000,000 points with a single jump.

After every second zoo stage, the goal is to jump on moving platforms to reach a platform at top center, where Zelda is tied to a tree. Some platforms carry bonus items. A monkey throws down coconuts that bounce among the platforms and must be avoided.

After every platform stage except the first, there is a stage with several escalators and a cage in front of each one. Zeke must cross the screen to get to each escalator, jumping over both the animals running toward him and the cage itself. Zelda is at the top of the last escalator. If he reaches her, the player earns an extra life. The first bonus stage has two escalators, the second one has three, and subsequent bonus stages have four.

Development
The initial design, from Keith Egging, was for a game about a crab that interacted with eggs and tadpoles that emerged from the eggs. As programmer John Morgan worked on the game, he made substantial changes and it evolved away from the original concept. He described how the art was created:

Later in the game, the ledges in the platform level are invisible, which according to Morgan is a bug. Because they always move in the same pattern, it still possible to beat the level, so he decided to leave the bug unfixed.

Ports
Zoo Keeper was not ported to contemporary home systems, but programmer Christopher H. Omarzu partially implemented an Atari 2600 version which was cancelled in 1984.

Legacy
Zoo Keeper was re-released in the 2005 Taito Legends collection for PlayStation 2, Xbox, and Microsoft Windows.

The game's main character, Zeke, later appeared in a family-friendly version of Taito's mechanical game Ice Cold Beer called Zeke's Peak. In this game, Zeke is a mountain climber instead of a zookeeper.

References

External links

Zoo Keeper at Arcade History
Video of attract mode and gameplay
Keeper of the Zoo, one player's quest for a world record

1983 video games
Arcade video games
Arcade-only video games
Platform games
Video games developed in the United States
Taito arcade games